The House of Ahlefeldt is an ancient German and Danish noble family. It has similar coat of arms with the von Rumohr family, which indicates that they have descended from one House.

Legend 
According to legend, the family descended from "Hunold" Hunoldus comes de Schwabeck, whose great-grandson Konrad (Conradus baron de Alhefeld) 1152 participated in the murder of Herman II, Count of Winzenburg, and then, in 1153, he went to serve King Sven III. In 1154 Konrad was overthrown, and he and his family had to flee from Denmark. However, written of records and evidence of these events are unavailable.

Origins 

The family originated from Westensee near Kiel, Germany. The earliest known ancestor is one Benedict von Ahlefeldt, (d c 1340), whose son and grandsons served King Waldemar of Denmark and received significant pawn fiefs and properties in Denmark.

In Duchy of Schleswig the family inherited estates Søgård, Nør, Königsförde-Lindau, Sakstorp and Gelting. In Holstein, Bossee, Lehmkulen, Wittmold, Deutsch-Nienhof, Emkendorf, Kl. Nordsee, Haseldorf and Fresenburg. Godske von Ahlefeldt (d. 1541) was the last Catholic Bishop of Schleswig.

Imperial Counts of Rixingen
Friedrich von Ahlefeldt (1623-1686) was raised ad personam in 1665 to Heiliger Römischer Reichsgraf, Count of the Holy Roman Empire in immediate vassalage to the Holy Roman Emperor. But in 1669 he bought the County of Rixingen (later passed to the Dukes of Richelieu in 1751), thus becoming the real sovereign count. Friedrich's daughter, Countess Christiane von Ahlefeldt-Rixingen (1659-1695) from his first marriage to Countess Magarethe Dorothea zu Rantzau (1642-1665) married Frederick Louis, Count of Nassau-Ottweiler. His two daughters from his second marriage to Countess Marie Elisabeth zu Leiningen-Dagsburg-Hartenburg (1648-1724), Countess Charlotte Sibylla (1672-1726) married Count Georg Ludwig zu Solms-Rödelheim (1664-1715) and Countess Sophie Amalie von Ahlefeldt-Rixingen married Prince Frederick William of Schleswig-Holstein-Sonderburg-Augustenburg. His two sons followed him as Governors in Schleswig and Holstein. The son from his first marriage, Count Friedrich von Ahlefedt (1662–1708), married Christiane Charlotte Gyldenløve in 1687, an illegitimate daughter of King Christian V of Denmark and Sophie Amalie Moth, Countess of Samsøe. His son from his second marriage, Count Carl von Ahlefeldt, inherited the dominions of Rixingen and Mörsberg in 1686, which he later passed on to his brother-in-law, Count Friedrich Ludwig von Nassau-Ottweiler. After the death of his older half-brother in 1708 Carl inherited the county of Langeland with Tranekær Castle.

Denmark line 
His kinsman, High royal councillor Burchard von Ahlefeldt received in 1672 letters patent as Danish count and the position of Lensgrave. He inherited the county of Langeland which was later inherited by his cousins, Imperial Counts von Ahlefeldt.

One of his grandsons, Count Christian von Ahlefeldt inherited the county of Laurvig in Norway, one of the two official counties ever in that country (the other was Jarlsberg, which belonged to the House of Wedel). In 1785 he received the royal licence to himself and his descendants to bear the name Ahlefeldt-Laurvig.

Holdings
The Ahlefeldt family accumulated large holdings of land on the territories of today's Germany and Denmark:
 Olpenitz (at Kappeln)
  Saxtorf (at Schwansen)
  Königsförde-Lindau (at the Eider Canal), the County of Langeland with Tranekær Castle
 Barony of Lehn
 Egeskov Castle
  Tranekær Castle, Eriksholm Castle, Fjællebro, Hjortholm, Møllerup, Skovsbo and Ulstrup Castle.

Gallery

References

 
Danish noble families
German noble families